John Trim (25 January 1915 – 12 November 1960) was a West Indian cricketer who played in four Tests from 1948 to 1952. A barrel-chested right-arm fast-medium bowler and right-handed lower-order batsman from Berbice, British Guiana, Trim's brief international career yielded 18 wickets at one of the lowest bowling averages of any completed career – 16.16 runs per wicket. In his first class career from 1944 to 1953 he played 34 matches, mostly for British Guiana, taking 96 wickets and making a solitary half-century with the bat.

Trim's Test debut came during the 1947–48 tour of the West Indies by Gubby Allen's England team. Trim took two wickets for an economical six runs in his first outing, with a further wicket in England's second innings. It was Trim's only match of the series, but he would tour India in January 1949, taking 4/48 and 3/28 in Chennai and 3/69 in Mumbai. He was then selected for the West Indian tour of Australia 1951–52 and took his career-best figures: a maiden five wicket haul of 5/35 at the Melbourne Cricket Ground.

Trim was the first Berbician to play Test cricket. He continued to play cricket in the Caribbean until 1953. He died in New Amsterdam, Berbice.

Sources
 George, M. (2012) A time in our history: Berbice Cricket from 1939 to 2012, Lulu.com.

References

External links
 
 

1915 births
1960 deaths
West Indies Test cricketers
Guyanese cricketers
Guyana cricketers
People from New Amsterdam, Guyana